Cephaloscymnus is a genus of lady beetles in the family Coccinellidae. There are at least four described species in Cephaloscymnus.

Species
These four species belong to the genus Cephaloscymnus:
 Cephaloscymnus insulatus Gordon, 1970
 Cephaloscymnus laevis Gordon, 1970
 Cephaloscymnus occidentalis Horn, 1895
 Cephaloscymnus zimmermanni Crotch, 1873

References

Further reading

 
 

Coccinellidae
Coccinellidae genera
Articles created by Qbugbot